Saint Matronian (U.S.) was a hermit of Milan.   It is recorded that Saint Ambrose enshrined Matronian's relics in the church of San Nazaro Maggiore in Milan.

External links

St. Matronian

Christian saints in unknown century
Italian saints
Italian hermits
Religious leaders from Milan
Year of birth unknown